Beridinae is a subfamily of soldier flies in the family Stratiomyidae.

Genera

 Actina Meigen, 1804
 Actinomyia Lindner, 1949
 Allognosta Osten Sacken, 1883
 Anexaireta Woodley, 1995
 Archistratiomys Enderlein, 1913
 Arcuavena Woodley, 1995
 Aspartimas Woodley, 1995
 Australoactina Woodley, 1995
 Australoberis Lindner, 1958
 Benhamyia Miller, 1945
 Beridella Becker, 1919
 Beridops Enderlein, 1913
 Beris Latreille, 1802
 Berisina Malloch, 1928
 Berismyia Giglio-Tos, 1891
 Chorisops Rondani, 1856
 Draymonia Aubertin, 1932
 Eumecacis Enderlein, 1921
 Exaeretina Enderlein, 1921
 Exaireta Schiner, 1868
 Hadrestia Thomson, 1869
 Heteracanthia Macquart, 1850
 Macromeracis Enderlein, 1921
 Microhadrestia Lindner, 1943
 Mischomedia Woodley, 1995
 Neactina Enderlein, 1921
 Neoberis Lindner, 1949
 Oplachantha Rondani, 1863
 Paraberismyia Woodley, 1995
 Smaragdinomyia Woodley, 1995
 Spartimas Enderlein, 1921
 Tytthoberis Woodley, 1995
 Zealandoberis Woodley, 1995

References

Stratiomyidae
Brachycera subfamilies
Taxa named by John O. Westwood